Rain is a 2006 film directed by Craig DiBona.  The screenplay was written by Andrew Neiderman, based on the novel by V. C. Andrews.  It premiered at the Palm Beach International Film Festival.

Plot
A talented young pianist named Rain (Brooklyn Sudano) is attacked by a vicious street gang which kills her sister. The gang sets out to find Rain while she hides in the care of a woman who is her natural grandmother. Rain was put up for adoption because the father of the baby was black and the mother was from a rich white family. Her adoptive mother (Khandi Alexander) sends her back because she is in danger for having witnessed her adoptive sister's murder.

Cast
Brooklyn Sudano as Rain Arnold
Faye Dunaway as Isabel Hudson
Robert Loggia as Jake
Khandi Alexander  as Latitia Arnold
Giancarlo Esposito as Ken Arnold
Emily Ryals as Monica
Katie Fountain as Colleen Lewis

References

External links 

2006 films
Films based on American novels
Films set in Dallas
Films shot in Dallas
American independent films
2006 drama films
2006 directorial debut films
2000s American films